Esporte Clube Taubaté, commonly referred to as Taubaté, is a professional association football club based in Taubaté, São Paulo, Brazil. The team competes in Campeonato Paulista Série A2, the second tier of the São Paulo state football league.

The club's home colours are blue and white and the team mascot is a donkey.

History
The idea of founding a football club in Taubaté appeared when the football fans José Pedro de Oliveira, Jayme Tindal and Frederico Livrero had a meeting at Associação Comercial, and they decided to study the viability of founding a football club in the city. At that meeting they decided that the name of the club would be Sport Club Taubaté.

On October 25, 1914, the colors of the club were chosen: blue and white. On November 1, 1914, the club was founded as Sport Club Taubaté.

First match
The first match of the club was on December 25, 1914, against AA Palmeiras at Estádio da Praça Monsenhor Silva Barros (known also as Campo do Bosque) in Taubaté. The match ended with a defeat by 1–6. The players of Taubaté were Paulinho, Luiz Simi, Paiva; Synésio, Sérgio Areão, Hugo; Paulo Silva, Waldemiro, Renato Granadeiro (captain), Abreu and Jacinto. Irito also played.

Titles
The club won the following titles:

Campeonato Paulista Série A-2: 1918, 1926, 1928, 1942, 1954, 1979
Campeonato Paulista A-3: 2003, 2015
Campeonato Paulista de Juniores - 2ª Divisão: 1985

Rivalry
Taubaté has a fierce rivalry with São José. 1979 Campeonato Paulista second division final match was an epic match between them. Another rival of Taubaté is Guaratinguetá.

Symbols and colors
The club's mascot is a donkey, known as Burro da Central (burro means donkey in Portuguese). In 1954, the club played the Campeonato Paulista second division final against Comercial of Ribeirão Preto and fielded an ineligible player in the match. Because of this mistake, the press of São Paulo nicknamed the club Burro (Donkey) not just meaning for donkey but for being dumb because of this mistake.

The blue color of the club represents the infinity of the sky, and the white color represents peace.

See also
São José Esporte Clube and Esporte Clube Taubaté football rivalry

References

External links
 Taubaté Official Web Site
Fan Site

 
Association football clubs established in 1914
1914 establishments in Brazil
Taubaté
Football clubs in São Paulo (state)